Otradnoye is a rural locality (a selo) in Kytmanovsky District, Altai Krai, Russia. The population was 215 as of 2013. There are 5 streets.

Geography 
Otradnoye is located 37 km north of Kytmanovo (the district's administrative centre) by road. Uskovo is the nearest rural locality.

References 

Rural localities in Kytmanovsky District